John Proude (died ca. 1409), of Sellindge and Canterbury, Kent, was an English politician.

Family
Proude married three times. Before 1374, he married a woman named Margaret, and they had one son and one daughter. Before 1404, he married for a second time, to Joan. He later married a woman named Christine.

Career
Proude was a Member of Parliament for the constituency of Canterbury, Kent in 1391 and 1394.

References

Year of birth missing
1409 deaths
14th-century births
English MPs 1391
People from Canterbury
English MPs 1394
People from Sellindge